St. Joseph's College, Garbally Park (Irish: Coláiste Sheosaimh Naofa) is an Irish voluntary Catholic secondary school situated in Garbally Park, the former seat of the Earl of Clancarty, near Ballinasloe in County Galway. It is a single-sex boys day school which has previously served as a boarding school. It is more commonly known  as Garbally College (Irish: Coláiste Ghearrbhaile).

History
St Joseph's College was founded as a Roman Catholic seminary in 1892 to help educate priests for the Diocese of Clonfert, which owns it. It is managed by Michael Duignan, Bishop of Clonfert and Bishop of Galway, along with four other governors. It is staffed by a priest of the diocese and lay teachers.

The college was established at Cartron with funds provided by James Madden. Due to expansion the college was changed to Esker, near Athenry in 1894. In 1901, it moved to the building known locally as "The Pines", at Creagh, Ballinasloe. In 1923, it moved to its present site at Garbally, once seat of the Earls of Clancarty. The Diocese purchased Garbally Court (built in 1819) and estate from the trustees of the Earls of Clancarty for £6,750 in 1922.

In the 1940s, 50s and 60s two other members of the same Madden family, brothers John Madden of Killimor and George Madden of London bestowed many gifts on Garbally, including the funds to build the present science halls, study hall, extra classrooms and dining hall.

Curriculum
The school offers both the Junior and Leaving Certificate cycles and was one of the first schools to implement a Transition Year programme when it was introduced in 1973. Garbally offers all the mandatory subjects, along with woodwork, metalwork, home economics, technical graphics, business studies, design & communication and music.

Sport
Garbally College is known for its sporting tradition in rugby union, hurling, Gaelic football and soccer. The college has won several Connacht Schools Senior Cups and Connacht Schools Junior Cups and has produced a number of Irish Rugby Internationals. Garbally has won the Senior Cup 48 times, most recently in 2020. Garbally have won the Junior Cup 43 times, most recently in 2019. The last team to include borders, which won the cup, was in 2007.

Notable alumni

Academia
 Patrick Gullane, Professor and Chair, Department of Otolaryngology–Head and Neck Surgery, University of Toronto
 Philip Pettit, William Nelson Cromwell Professor of Politics at Princeton University
 Michael Tierney, president of University College Dublin

Arts and media
 Jim Fahy, RTÉ western correspondent, journalist, broadcaster and documentary maker
 Desmond Hogan, novelist
 Seán Moncrieff, media broadcaster/presenter
 Ulick O'Connor, writer, historian and critic
 Eoghan Ó Tuairisc, writer, poet, dramatist
 Tommy Tiernan, comedian, actor and writer

Business
 Ulick McEvaddy, businessman

Politics
 Patrick Beegan, former Fianna Fáil Teachta Dála
 Seán Calleary, former Fianna Fáil Teachta Dála
 Patrick Connolly, former Attorney General of Ireland.
 Eamon Gilmore, Tánaiste, Minister for Foreign Affairs and Trade and the former Leader of the Labour Party
 Brendan Glynn, former Fine Gael Teachta Dála
 Brian Hayes, Fine Gael Teachta Dála for Dublin South-West
 Patrick Hogan, first Minister for Agriculture
 Seán Kenny, Labour Party Teachta Dála
 Tony Kett, former Fianna Fáil member of Seanad Éireann
 Gerry Reynolds, former Fine Gael Teachta Dála for Sligo–Leitrim
 Michael Tierney, former Cumann na nGaedheal TD and president of University College Dublin
 Noel Treacy, former Fianna Fáil Teachta Dála for Galway East

Religious
 Patrick Joseph Kelly, former Bishop of Benin City
 John Kirby, former Catholic Bishop of Clonfert
 Michael Griffin, Catholic priest, murdered by Crown forces in 1920
 John Fahy, priest, republican, agrarian and radical

Sports
 Michael Duignan,  All-Ireland winning former Offaly hurler, RTÉ Gaelic games commentator.
 Ciaran Fitzgerald, former Irish rugby international
 Noel Mannion, former rugby player
 Ray McLoughlin, former Irish rugby international and chairman and chief executive of The Crean Group
 Johnny O'Connor, Irish rugby international
 Tiernan O'Halloran, Irish rugby international
 Willie Ruane, rugby player, CEO of Connacht Rugby
 Colm Reilly, rugby player
 John Muldoon, rugby union coach, former player
 Shane Jennings, Irish rugby international

Notable staff and former staff
 Ulick Burke, Fine Gael Teachta Dála for Galway East

See also
Garbally House
Roman Catholic Diocese of Clonfert
Roman Catholic Diocese of Galway, Kilmacduagh and Kilfenora

References

External links
 St. Joseph's College website (Colaiste Sheosaimh) Garbally College {Official College Website}
 Garbally College homepage (defunct)

Ballinasloe
Private schools in the Republic of Ireland
Boys' schools in the Republic of Ireland
Secondary schools in County Galway
Educational institutions established in 1892
1892 establishments in Ireland